The Type 83 destroyer is a class of guided-missile destroyers which is planned to enter service with the United Kingdom's Royal Navy in the late 2030s as a replacement for the current Type 45 destroyer.

Background

The Royal Navy currently operates six Type 45 destroyers, also known as the Daring class, which first entered service in 2009 and are planned to leave service between 2035 and 2037. They are used principally for anti-air warfare (AAW) and are equipped with the Sea Viper air defence system to carry out this role.  Sea Viper comprises the SAMPSON multi-function radar, a 48-cell Sylver Vertical Launching System (VLS) and Aster anti-air missiles. The ships have also been used outside of their specialist roles to carry out counter-piracy missions, counter-drug trafficking, maritime security patrols and humanitarian assistance.

Development
The class was first unveiled in March 2021 with the publication of the British government's defence command paper, Defence in a Competitive Age. The class was mentioned in the context of the government's 2030 shipbuilding strategy and planned long-term investments.  According to The National Interest, the "8X" designation may suggest the ship will be more in line with the concept of the Type 82 destroyer, a large vessel which was sometimes described as a light cruiser and originally designed to escort the Royal Navy's last large fleet carriers, the cancelled CVA-01s. No design specifics have yet been confirmed publicly, but the ship is expected to enter the concept phase in early 2022.

In February 2022, the Ministry of Defence confirmed the ship would be designed to address the threat of hypersonic missiles. It may also form part of a wider system known as the Future Air Dominance System.

See also
 Future of the Royal Navy

References

Destroyer classes
Ship classes of the Royal Navy
Proposed ships of the Royal Navy
United Kingdom defence procurement